Robert Helmick (March 5, 1937 – April 15, 2003) was the president of FINA and United States Olympic Committee.  He also served as a  Secretary of FINA and vice-president of the International Olympics Committee.

Biography 
Helmick was born in Des Moines, Iowa.  He first began his career in the Olympics by managing the United States water polo team. He was elected president of the Amateur Athletic Union in 1978 and served until 1980. He became president of the United States Olympic Committee in 1985, which was the year he was elected to join the IOC. He became United States Olympic Committee on March 22, filling the vacancy left after the death in office of John B. Kelly Jr. Helmick died in Des Moines in 2003.

References

International Olympic Committee members
Presidents of FINA
United States Olympic Committee
1937 births
2003 deaths
Presidents of the United States Olympic Committee
Drake University Law School alumni